Medusa (French - La Méduse) or Head of a Woman "Medusa", Light and Shadow (Tête de femme « Méduse », Lumière et Ombre) is a 1923 Expressionist painting by Alexej von Jawlensky. It is now in the Musée des Beaux-Arts de Lyon, which acquired it in 1936. It is an early work by the artist, who had begun to focus on painting the human figure in 1917.

References

1923 paintings
Paintings by Alexej von Jawlensky
Paintings in the collection of the Museum of Fine Arts of Lyon
Cultural depictions of Medusa